Duets II may refer to:

 Duets II (Frank Sinatra album)
 Duets II (Tony Bennett album)